The 1964 Southern Conference men's basketball tournament took place from February 27 to February 29, 1964, at the original Charlotte Coliseum in Charlotte, North Carolina. The VMI Keydets, led by head coach Weenie Miller, won their first Southern Conference title and received the automatic berth to the 1964 NCAA tournament.

Format 
The top eight finishers of the conference's nine members were eligible for the tournament. The teams were seeded based on conference winning percentage. The tournament used a preset bracket consisting of three rounds.

Bracket 

* Overtime game

See also 
 List of Southern Conference men's basketball champions

References 

Tournament
Southern Conference men's basketball tournament
Southern Conference men's basketball tournament
Southern Conference men's basketball tournament
Basketball competitions in Charlotte, North Carolina
College sports tournaments in North Carolina
College basketball in North Carolina